The  is an official inauguration ceremony whereby the Emperor of Japan formally appoints the nominated Chief Justice or the nominated Prime Minister of Japan to office.

During the time period of the Empire of Japan, as the Emperor was the source of executive authority, there were also investitures held for military officials.

Ceremony 

Several officials are present to witness the entire ceremony.

The ceremony first starts with the Prime Minister nominee formally greeting the Emperor upon entering the room. The Emperor greets back upon their approach and addresses that he or she is about to be appointed to office. The Prime Minister nominee acknowledges the Emperor by bowing and then turning to their side to receive their letter of appointment from the former Prime Minister (or the current Prime Minister in the case of the appointment of the Chief Justice) containing the Emperor's Privy Seal and signature. The Prime Minister nominee turns back to face the Emperor, bowing and receding, before making their way to the entrance and then bowing again before leaving the room. The Emperor then leaves the room followed by the other officials.

For the appointment of the Prime Minister, both the Speaker of the House of Representatives and the President of the House of Councillors are present. If the current Prime Minister is re-appointed, then a Minister of State (usually the Deputy Prime Minister) will take over the role as the former Prime Minister in the investiture ceremony.

In practice, the Prime Minister is nominated by the Diet, while the Chief Justice is nominated by the Cabinet. The Emperor is required to appoint the nominated person, without the right to decline appointment.

Although they are formally appointed by the Prime Minister, the Constitution stipulates that the ceremony must be attested by the Emperor.

References

External links
Official Website 
Official Website 
Video of the Investiture Ceremony
Video of the Attestation Ceremony

Japanese monarchy
Government of Japan
Ceremonies in Japan